Didier Mathus (born May 25, 1952 in Montceau-les-Mines) is a member of the National Assembly of France.  He represents the Saône-et-Loire department,  and is a member of the Socialiste, radical, citoyen et divers gauche.

References

1952 births
Living people
People from Montceau-les-Mines
Socialist Party (France) politicians
Deputies of the 12th National Assembly of the French Fifth Republic
Deputies of the 13th National Assembly of the French Fifth Republic